Normand Duguay (born October 17, 1941) is a former Canadian politician, who represented the riding of Duplessis in the National Assembly of Quebec from 1997 to 2003. He was a member of the Parti Québécois.

Born in Rivière-au-Tonnerre, Quebec, Duguay was first elected in a by-election in 1997, following the death of Denis Perron. He was re-elected in the 1998 election, but did not run again in the 2003 election.

External links
 

1941 births
French Quebecers
Living people
Parti Québécois MNAs
People from Côte-Nord
21st-century Canadian politicians